Edward Russell Malone (June 16, 1920 – June 1, 2006) was an American professional baseball player. A catcher, he had a long career in minor league baseball (1938 through 1954, with the exception of the wartime 1945 campaign), interrupted by an 86-game Major League stint with the – Chicago White Sox.

Malone was purchased by White Sox from the crosstown Cubs' Los Angeles Angels farm team in the midseason of 1949.  He started 48 games at catcher for the remainder of the season (alternating with Don Wheeler and Joe Tipton) and batted .271 in 170 at bats. The following year, Malone backed up starting receiver Phil Masi through late June, but on June 27 the White Sox acquired Gus Niarhos from the New York Yankees and sent Malone via the Yankees to the Oakland Oaks of the Pacific Coast League.  He played the rest of the career in the PCL with Oakland and the Hollywood Stars.

References

External links

1920 births
2006 deaths
Albuquerque Cardinals players
Asheville Tourists players
Baseball players from California
Baseball players from Illinois
Chicago White Sox players
Columbus Red Birds players
Duluth Dukes players
Hollywood Stars players
Los Angeles Angels (minor league) players
Major League Baseball catchers
Oakland Oaks (baseball) players
Pocatello Cardinals players
Rochester Red Wings players
Sacramento Solons players